The H. K Bedford was a passenger and trade ship of the Greene Line.

Ship history
It was built in 1886 at Jeffersonville, Indiana for trade along the Ohio River and upper Cumberland River.  In June 1890 she was purchased by Gordon C. Greene. She was caught in an ice floe and sank on February 29, 1912 about 8 miles upstream from Marietta, Ohio.

References

1886 ships
Disasters in Ohio
Maritime incidents in 1912
Ships built in Jeffersonville, Indiana
Buildings and structures in Washington County, Ohio

Passenger ships of the United States
Delta Queen Steamboat Company
Shipwrecks of the Ohio River